John Scudamore, (1 February 1542 – 14 April 1623) was the eldest son of William Scudamore (d. 1560) and Ursula Pakington (d. 1558), the daughter of Sir John Pakington, but due to his father's early death was a ward of Sir James Croft of Croft Castle, Herefordshire, whose daughter Eleanor Croft (d. 1569) he had married by 1563.

When James Croft became a Comptroller of the Household in 1570, Scudamore (though by then widowed) became a courtier and was appointed Gentleman Usher to Queen Elizabeth and Standard Bearer to The Honourable Band of Gentleman Pensioners. He became Custos Rotulorum of Herefordshire in 1574, deputy lieutenant in 1575 and High Sheriff of Herefordshire for 1581. He was elected knight of the shire for Herefordshire for six terms, sitting continuously from 1571 to 1589 and again in 1597.

Family
His second wife, Mary Scudamore, daughter of Sir John Shelton of Norfolk and a member of the queen's privy chamber, was more important than he was because she had the queen's ear.  Following Croft's death in 1590, his influence waned. His heir was his second son by his first marriage, Sir James Scudamore whose own son was ennobled as John Scudamore, 1st Viscount Scudamore.  His oldest surviving son, John Scudamore was ordained a priest in Rome in 1592.

Notes

References
 
History of Parliament SCUDAMORE, John (c.1542-1523) of Holme Lacy, Herefords.

1542 births
1623 deaths
John
17th-century English people
High Sheriffs of Herefordshire
English MPs 1571
English MPs 1572–1583
English MPs 1584–1585
English MPs 1586–1587
English MPs 1589
English MPs 1597–1598
English courtiers
Court of Elizabeth I